SC-4289 is a synthetic nonsteroidal estrogen which, along with mytatrienediol (SC-6924; Manvene, Anvene), was developed in the late 1950s as a potential treatment for atherosclerosis in men but was never marketed.

References

Abandoned drugs
Primary alcohols
Naphthalenes
Synthetic estrogens